Jun Amano (天野 純, born 19 July 1991) is a Japanese professional footballer who plays for K League 1 club Jeonbuk Hyundai Motors, on loan from Yokohama F. Marinos.

Club career

Career statistics

Club 
Updated to 7 July 2019.

National team

Honours
Yokohama F. Marinos
Japanese Super Cup: 2014 Runners-Up

Ulsan Hyundai
K League 1: 2022

References

External links

Profile at Yokohama F. Marinos 
Retrieved 2015-06-06

1991 births
Living people
Juntendo University alumni
Association football people from Kanagawa Prefecture
Japanese footballers
Japanese expatriate footballers
J1 League players
Challenger Pro League players
Yokohama F. Marinos players
Ulsan Hyundai FC players
Jeonbuk Hyundai Motors players
K.S.C. Lokeren Oost-Vlaanderen players
Japan international footballers
Association football midfielders
Universiade bronze medalists for Japan
Universiade medalists in football
Japanese expatriate sportspeople in Belgium
Expatriate footballers in Belgium
Medalists at the 2013 Summer Universiade